Kaskaskia is a village in Randolph County, Illinois. Having been inhabited by indigenous peoples, it was settled by France as part of the Illinois Country. It was named for the Kaskaskia people. Its population peaked at about 7,000 in the 18th century, when it was a regional center. During the American Revolutionary War, the town, which by then had become an administrative center for the British Province of Quebec, was taken by the Virginia militia during the Illinois campaign. It was designated as the county seat of Illinois County, Virginia, after which it became part of the Northwest Territory in 1787.  Kaskaskia was later named as the capital of the United States' Illinois Territory, created on February 3, 1809. In 1818, when Illinois became the 21st U.S. state, the town briefly served as the state's first capital until 1819, when the capital was moved to more centrally located Vandalia.
 
Most of the town was destroyed in April 1881 by flooding, as the Mississippi River shifted eastward to a new channel, taking over the lower  of the Kaskaskia River.  This resulted from deforestation of the river banks during the 19th century, due to crews taking wood for fuel to feed the steamboat and railroad traffic. The river now passes east rather than west of the town. The state boundary line, however, remained in its original location. Accordingly, if the Mississippi River is considered to be a break in physical continuity, Kaskaskia is an exclave of Illinois, lying west of the Mississippi and accessible only from Missouri. A small bridge crosses the old riverbed, now a creek that is sometimes filled with water during flood season.

In the 2020 United States Census the population was 21, making it the third-least populous incorporated community in Illinois behind Valley City (pop. 14) and Florence (pop. 17). Kaskaskia has an Illinois telephone area code (618) and a Missouri ZIP Code (63673). Its roads are maintained by Illinois Department of Transportation, and its few residents vote in Illinois elections.

History
The site of Kaskaskia near the Mississippi River was long inhabited by varying Native American indigenous peoples for thousands of years. The Kaskaskia, part of the Illiniwek peoples, colonized this area in the 1600s, and lived there at the time of European encounter and traded with the early French colonists. Historically this name was referred to with many spelling variations, as Kasklas, Kaskasky, Cas-caskias, Kasquskias, and Kaskaskias.  

During the Beaver Wars, Kaskaskia grew as people sought common defense against Iroquois raids.  The numbers swelled to around twenty thousand people by the 1680s.  Kaskaskia aligned with the French to aid in defense against the Iroquois.  The French also gave them trade goods, which Kaskaskia merchants used to trade with nations too far South or West for French traders to reach.  Kaskaskia became heavily involved in the slave trade, capturing and selling people from neighboring nations.

By the 1690s, Kaskaskia was in decline.  This was in part due to an epidemic that hit the large town particularly hard.  By this time, it had also become harder to obtain sources of wood and bison near Kaskaskia.  The Great Peace of Montreal in 1701, which ended the Beaver Wars, also reduced the need for mutual defense.

French settlement
In 1703, French Jesuit missionaries established a mission with the goal of converting the Native Americans to Catholicism. The congregation built its first stone church in 1714. The French also had a fur trading post in the village. Canadien settlers moved in to farm and to exploit the lead mines on the opposite side of the river (now in Missouri).
 
Favorably situated on a peninsula on the east side of the Mississippi River, Kaskaskia became a large settlement center attracting a large proportion of the region's Native American population. It became the capital of Upper Louisiana and the French built Fort de Chartres nearby in 1718. In the same year they imported the first enslaved Africans, shipped from Santo Domingo in the Caribbean, to work as laborers in the lead mines.

From the years of early French settlement, Kaskaskia was a multicultural village, consisting of a few French men and numerous Illinois and other American Indians. In 1707, the population of the community was estimated at 2,200, the majority of them Illinois who lived somewhat apart from the Europeans. Writing of Kaskaskia about 1715, a visitor said that the village consisted of 400 Illinois men, "good people;" two Jesuit missionaries, and "about twenty French voyageurs who have settled there and married Indian women."  Of 21 children whose birth and baptism was recorded in Kaskaskia before 1714, 18 had mothers who were Indian and 20 had fathers who were French. One devout Catholic, full-blooded Indian woman disowned her mixed-race son for living "among the savage nations".

Many of the Canadiens and their descendants at Kaskaskia became voyageurs and coureurs des bois, who would explore and exploit the Missouri River country for fur trading.  The Canadiens had the goal of trading with all the Prairie tribes, and beyond them, with the Spanish colony in New Mexico. The Spanish intended to keep control of the latter trade. The Canadien goals stimulated the expedition of Claude Charles Du Tisne to establish trade relations with the Plains Indians in 1719.

King Louis XV sent a bell to Kaskaskia in 1741 for its church, one of several constructed there. During the years of French rule, Kaskaskia and the other agricultural settlements in the Illinois Country were critical for supplying Lower Louisiana, especially New Orleans, with wheat and corn, as these staple crops could not be grown in the Gulf climate. Farmers shipped tons of flour south over the years, which helped New Orleans survive.

The French settlers raised Fort Kaskaskia around 1759; the fort stood atop the bluff that overlooked the frontier village.[1] "Fort Kaskaskia" is not technically a "fort", but an earthen redoubt. Frontier settlers throughout Woodland North America often built such redoubts for defense during times of threat from Native Americans.

In 1763, the French ceded the Illinois country, including Kaskaskia and the redoubt, to Great Britain after being defeated in the Seven Years' War (known as the French and Indian War on the North American front). The British did not use the redoubt but from 1766 through 1772, maintained a rotating detachment of around 25 men under a junior officer, from Fort de Chartres. They used the Jesuit compound as their base.

Rather than live under British rule after France ceded the territory east of the river, many French-speaking people from Kaskaskia and other colonial towns had moved west of the Mississippi to Ste. Genevieve, St. Louis, and other areas. In May 1772, when the British abandoned Fort de Chartres, Kaskaskia continued to survive as a primarily French-speaking village on the Mississippi River frontier.

American settlement
During one of the westernmost military campaigns of the American Revolution, the city fell on July 4, 1778, to George Rogers Clark and his force of 200 men, including Captains Joseph Bowman and Leonard Helm.  The parish rang the church bell in celebration, and it has since been called the "liberty bell". The brick church, built in 1843 in the squared-off French style, was later moved to the restored village of Kaskaskia on the west side of the Mississippi.

In 1803, the Kaskaskia people, for whom the town is named, signed a treaty with the United States of America, arranged by future president William Henry Harrison, who was at that time governor of the Indiana territory, and Kaskaskia chief Jean Baptiste Ducoigne. Ducoigne was of mixed descent, noted for being friendly with the United States and being hated by other tribal chiefs. The treaty specifically provides for a house on a lot of "no more than one hundred acres" for Jean Baptiste Ducoigne and that a "suitable sum" of all material and monetary payments to the tribe would be reserved for the chief and his family. This treaty was said to "rightfully represent" not only the Kaskaskia tribe but also the Cahokia, Mitchigamia, and Tamarois, though the signatures for those tribes were not made by chiefs and were marked only with 'X' and a notation of the individual's name, one of which was noted as "Micolas or Nicolas."

In exchange for ceding a tract of land comprising approximately half the area of modern-day Illinois, the Kaskaskia and associated tribes were allotted three hundred fifty acres "near the town of Kaskaskia," as well as the right to relocate to another larger settlement within the ceded territory.

As a center of the regional economy, Kaskaskia served as the capital of Illinois Territory from 1809 until statehood was gained in 1818, and then as the state capital until 1819. The first Illinois newspaper, the Illinois Herald, was published here on June 24, 1814.

The city's peak population was about 7,000, before the capital was moved in 1819 to Vandalia. Although the introduction of steamboats on the Mississippi River stimulated the economies of river towns, in the 19th century, their use also had devastating environmental effects. Deforestation of the river banks followed steamboat crews' regular cutting of trees, which were used to feed the engine boiler fires as fuel to power the steamboats. Through this rapid, man-made erosion, river banks became unstable, resulting in massive amounts of soil to collapse into the flowing water.

In 1832, during the era of Indian removal, the Peoria tribe, speaking for Kaskaskia, Cahokia, Mitchigamia, and Tamarois, signed a second treaty. This treaty was arranged by Superintendent of Indian Affairs William Clark, who was at that same time a figurehead in the implementation of the Indian Removal Act, associated with the Trail of Tears further south. The treaty was signed two months after the end of the Black Hawk War in northwestern Illinois, between the Sauk tribe and the United States. The Sauk disputed the validity of a treaty similar to the Kaskaskia treaty of 1803, arranged by William Henry Harrison in 1804. The Sauk lost the Black Hawk War, resulting in the death of half of the Sauk forces. The Kaskaskia treaty of 1832 relinquished all lands reserved for the tribe in the 1803 treaty with the exception of 350 acres near the town of Kaskaskia, Illinois, reserved to Ellen Ducoigne, a daughter of Jean Baptiste Ducoigne who had married a white man. All other members of all five tribes mentioned in the treaty were relocated to Indian Country in modern-day Kansas.

Effects on the Mississippi River
From St. Louis to the confluence of the Ohio River, the Mississippi became wider and more shallow, resulting in more severe seasonal flooding. In the late 19th century, the town was cut off from the Illinois mainland and mostly destroyed by repeated flooding and a channel change by the Mississippi River. Much of the former property of Kaskaskia and other French colonial towns on the river has been lost. Following the Great Flood of 1844, residents of Kaskaskia relocated the town to the south.  The original location of Kaskaskia became an island, surrounded by the Mississippi River.  The flood of 1881 destroyed all remnants of the original town and the Mississippi shifted into the channel of the Kaskaskia River, passing east instead of west of the town.

Parts of the town were rebuilt in the new area. As the Mississippi continued to flow through its new bed, earth was deposited so that the village land became physically attached to the west bank of the river, which primarily lies within the boundaries of the state of Missouri. Now a bayou, the old channel is regularly flooded by the river. A small bridge carries traffic from the mainland over the bayou to Kaskaskia and its surrounding farmlands in the floodplain. A levee lines the river to the east. In 1893 the people of the town moved and rebuilt the Church of the Immaculate Conception at Kaskaskia. They also built a shrine in a similar style nearby to house the "liberty bell."

By 1950, only 112 people lived in Kaskaskia. By 1970, the population had fallen to 79, and it continued to decline to 33 in 1980.  The town was submerged under nine feet of water by the Great Flood of 1993, which reached the roofs of the buildings. By 2000, with nine residents, Kaskaskia was almost a ghost town, the least populous incorporated community in the State of Illinois.

Geography

However, the village comprises only a small part of Kaskaskia Precinct, which includes all of Randolph County's land west of the Mississippi. The precinct forms an exclave of Illinois within Missouri. In 1993 the Mississippi River almost completely flooded the island.

Demographics

As of the census of 2000, there were 9 people, 4 households, and 3 families residing in the village. The racial makeup of the village was 7 White, 1 Pacific Islander, 1 from other races. There were 2 Hispanics or Latinos of any race.

There were four households, none of which had children under the age of 18 living with them. Two were married couples living together, one had a female householder with no husband present, and one was a non-family. One household was made up of individuals, and one had someone living alone who was 65 years of age or older. The average household size was 2.25 and the average family size was 2.67.

In the village two people were under the age of 18, both girls. There was one person from 18 to 24, one from 25 to 44, two from 45 to 64, and three who were 65 years of age or older. The median age was 48 years. There were seven females and two males.

Notable people

 David J. Baker, United States senator
 David J. Baker Jr., Chief Justice of the Illinois Supreme Court
 Shadrach Bond, the first Governor of Illinois
 John Duff, outlaw and Revolutionary War soldier; scout and sergeant under George Rogers Clark
 Thomas Duncan, general during the American Civil War
 John Edgar, businessman and legislator
 George Fisher, pioneer, physician, and legislator
 John Rice Jones, jurist and politician
 Samuel Judy, pioneer and legislator
 Lucien Maxwell, rancher
 John Willis Menard, the first African American elected to the United States Congress
 James L. D. Morrison, Mexican War officer, U.S. Representative, gubernatorial candidate
 John Doyle Lee, Colleague of Brigham Young, leader of the Mountain Meadows Massacre.
 Nance Legins-Costley, first slave freed by Abraham Lincoln

See also 
 Kaskaskia Bell State Memorial

References

Further reading
 Isaac Lippincott, "Industry among the French in the Illinois country." Journal of Political Economy 18.2 (1910): 114–128. online
 
 Kaskaskia village and Kaskaskia precinct, Randolph County, Illinois United States Census Bureau

External links

 "Images -Kaskaskia, IL", Computer Chair Traveler
 "Immaculate Conception Church on Kaskaskia Island", GuidepostUSA
 "Kaskaskia Bell State Historic Site", GuidepostUSA
 Stead v. Commons of Kaskaskia, 1 Scam. 239 (1909)
 "Curse of Kaskaskia". Prairie Ghosts

Villages in Randolph County, Illinois
Former colonial and territorial capitals in the United States
Illinois
Former islands of the United States
Populated places established in 1703
Islands of the Mississippi River
Illinois populated places on the Mississippi River
Border irregularities of the United States
French-American culture in Illinois
Catholic missions of New France
Pre-statehood history of Illinois
French colonial settlements of Upper Louisiana
River islands of Illinois
Exclaves in the United States
1703 establishments in the French colonial empire
Former county seats in Virginia